Bear's Rib (Sioux name Matȟó Čhuthúhu) was a Húŋkpapȟa Lakota chief from the late 19th century who advocated for peace with the United States.

References

Sources
"Bears Rib" from Famous Indian Chiefs, page 20, from Axel-jacob.de, URL accessed 05/18/06

Year of death missing
Lakota leaders
Year of birth unknown
Hunkpapa people
19th-century Native Americans